Joseph John "Joe" Czarnota (March 25, 1925 – October 9, 1968) was an American ice hockey player. He won a silver medal at the 1952 Winter Olympics in Oslo, Norway.
After Czarnota graduated from high school he enlisted in the military and fought in World War II with the Marines.  When he finished serving, he started school at Boston University playing hockey and worked his way to the Olympics.

References

1925 births
1968 deaths
American men's ice hockey defensemen
Ice hockey players at the 1952 Winter Olympics
Medalists at the 1952 Winter Olympics
Olympic silver medalists for the United States in ice hockey
Boston University Terriers men's ice hockey players
United States Marine Corps personnel of World War II